Jasmin Handanović (born 28 January 1978) is a Slovenian retired footballer who played as a goalkeeper. He is the oldest player to ever play in the Slovenian top division.

Club career
In July 2010, Handanović was signed by Empoli, replacing Davide Bassi as the new first choice. However, he was then replaced by Alberto Pelagotti. In 2011, he signed for Maribor.

While playing for Maribor, on 5 November 2014, in a UEFA Champions League group match against Chelsea, he saved an 85th-minute penalty from Eden Hazard to ensure a 1–1 draw.

Handanović retired from professional football after the 2020–21 season. His jersey with the number 33 was retired by Maribor.

International career
Handanović made his full international debut on 19 November 2008, in a 4–3 friendly defeat to Bosnia and Herzegovina. In his next international cap on 28 March 2009, he kept a clean sheet in a goalless World Cup qualifier against the Czech Republic. Handanović was one of three Slovenian goalkeepers chosen to go to the 2010 FIFA World Cup, but did not feature in any matches. He played his final game for the national team in September 2012 against Switzerland.

Personal life
Jasmin is the cousin of Samir Handanović, who is also a professional goalkeeper.

Honours
Olimpija
Slovenian Cup: 1999–2000

Koper
Slovenian Cup: 2005–06, 2006–07

Maribor
Slovenian PrvaLiga: 2011–12, 2012–13, 2013–14, 2014–15, 2016–17, 2018–19
Slovenian Cup: 2011–12, 2012–13, 2015–16
Slovenian Supercup: 2012, 2013, 2014

References

External links
Player profile at NZS 

1978 births
Living people
Slovenian people of Bosniak descent
Slovenian people of Bosnia and Herzegovina descent
Footballers from Ljubljana
Slovenian footballers
Association football goalkeepers
Slovenian PrvaLiga players
Slovenian Second League players
Serie B players
NK Svoboda Ljubljana players
NK Olimpija Ljubljana (1945–2005) players
NK Triglav Kranj players
NK Zagorje players
FC Koper players
Mantova 1911 players
Empoli F.C. players
NK Maribor players
Slovenia youth international footballers
Slovenia under-21 international footballers
Slovenia international footballers
2010 FIFA World Cup players
Slovenian expatriate footballers
Expatriate footballers in Italy
Slovenian expatriate sportspeople in Italy